Barangay West Rembo or previously known as Barangay 16 is a Barangay or Barrio in Makati's 2nd congressional district. It borders the Pasig river in its north side, East Rembo on its east, Cembo on its west, and Bonifacio Global City on its southern side.

References 

Populated places in the Philippines